The 2021 Arizona wildfire season was a series of wildfires that burned across the state of Arizona, United States. Wildfires across the state burned  of land in at least 1,773 fires throughout the state, fueled in part by a drought, hot temperatures, and thunderstorms producing dry lightning. At one point in late June, over 20 active wildfires were burning across the state. 

The total acres burned between the start of the year and the end of June was 22% more than during the same period of the preceding season, which itself was the most active in nearly a decade. The spike in wildfires in Arizona  during the summer was due to an ongoing megadrought that is occurring in the Southwestern United States, as well as a heat wave with many western cities hitting record-breaking temperatures.

Background 

The Arizona wildfire season usually begins in May and lasts through mid-July, when the North American Monsoon provides the Southwestern U.S with heavy rainfall to slow down fire activity throughout the region. But in June 2021, the Telegraph Fire became the 6th largest wildfire in Arizona history. Wildfires in Arizona at the time were making headlines due to a ridge of high pressure hovering over much of the southwest and severe drought also playing a major role in the Arizona wildfire season with more than 50% of the state being in 'Exceptional Drought'. The drought in the southwest was making the job of fighting wildland fires difficult because of water shortages in the region. At the time, Arizona was also seeing record-breaking temperatures with Phoenix hitting a high of 118 °F (47 °C) on June 17. Earlier on June 9, governor Doug Ducey issued Declarations of Emergency in response to the Telegraph and Mescal fires. The declarations provided up to $400,000 (USD) for efforts of response to wildfires. From June 14 to June 20, dry thunderstorms rolled into Arizona and produced dry lighting which spawned a larger outbreak of wildfires throughout the state. The outbreak got so bad that at one point, five out of six national forests had to be closed to the public in late June. These national forests included the Coconino, Kaibab, Prescott, Tonto and Apache-Sitgreaves national forests. The only people who were allowed in the forests were firefighters and people who owned property in the forests.

List of wildfires 
The following is a list of fires that burned more than 1,000 acres (400 ha), or produced significant structural damage or casualties.

Evacuations 

Margo Fire: Dudleyville

Flag Fire: Pine Lake

Tussock Fire: Fort Misery and Horsethief Basin

Spur Fire: Bagdad

Telegraph Fire: El Capitan, Dripping Springs, Miami, Top-of-the-World, Government Springs, Wind Spirit, Hagen Ranch, and Slash S Ranch

Pinnacle Fire: Klondyke and Aravaipa

Cornville Fire: Parts of Cornville (East of Page Springs Road)

Backbone Fire: Strawberry and Pine

Rafael Fire: Areas around Sycamore Canyon

Wyrick Fire: Antelope Valley and portions of Heber

West Chev Fire: Woods Canyon Lake

Walnut Fire: Residents near Dragoon

Tiger Fire: Horsethief Basin

See also 
 List of Arizona wildfires
 List of natural disasters in the United States

References

External links
 Arizona Interagency Wildfire Prevention – Wildfire News
 Southwest Coordination Center (SWCC)
  National Interagency Fire Center

2021 heat waves
2021 in Arizona
June 2021 events in the United States
Lists of wildfires in the United States
Wildfires in Arizona
2021 Arizona wildfires